Hassan Veneziano (fl. 1587), was regent of Algiers from 1577 to 1580 and from 1582 to 1587. His successor was Djafer Pasha.

A Venetian slave, he served Uludj Ali, when he was governor of Algiers and Capitan Pasha in Constantinople. He later appointed by him to head of the Regency of Algiers.

References

Pashas
Slaves from the Ottoman Empire
16th-century Venetian people
16th-century slaves
Rulers of the Regency of Algiers
Algerian people of Italian descent
Slavery in Algeria